Wildlife Victoria is a not for profit organisation that provides a wildlife emergency response service to the state of Victoria, Australia. Established in 1989 the service provides essential emergency wildlife support to the community by responding to enquiries from the public regarding sick, injured and orphaned wildlife.

The organization maintains a wildlife care and communications network of wildlife volunteers spanning the state of Victoria. This includes volunteer wildlife shelters, rescuer, carers and transporters, emergency services, government agencies and commercial operators.

Wildlife emergencies can be logged with the organisation via a dedicated telephone service that operates 24 hours, 7 days per week, or via the organisation's website. The emergency response service uses a comprehensive database to locate the closest available and suitable experienced volunteer, who then locates the animal and determines the appropriate course of action.

In 2021, Wildlife Victoria handled more than 100,000 enquiries from the public and assisted almost 90,000 native animals during their time of need.

Wildlife Victoria also provides wildlife information and education to the public on matters including wildlife related road trauma, wildlife safe fruit tree netting, how to check a marsupial's pouch for a joey and assisting native animals during heat stress.

A diverse range of animals is provided with emergency assistance, including kangaroos, possums, cockatoos, koalas, bats, blue tongued lizards, ducks and fur seals.

The organisation relies on donations from the public to fund its work. Each year, Wildlife Victoria distributes grants to wildlife volunteers to assist them to continue their work rescuing, transporting and rehabilitating native animals. Under legal obligations in the state of Victoria, native animals must be returned to the wild after they have been successfully rehabilitated.

Wildlife Victoria’s Chair is Catherine MacLeod and Lisa Palma is the CEO.

See also 
 Animal welfare and rights in Australia

References

External links

Wildlife sanctuaries of Australia
Animal charities based in Australia
Non-profit organisations based in Victoria (Australia)